The Château de la Chaize is a château in Odenas, Rhône, France. It was completed in 1676. The project was financed by Louis XIV's personal chaplain, François de la Chaise, "and his grateful nephew, the original owner, named the chateau for his munificent uncle." The architect was Jules Hardouin-Mansart, and André Le Nôtre designed the gardens. It has been listed as an official historical monument since April 27, 1972.

References

Houses completed in 1675
Châteaux in Rhône (department)
Monuments historiques of Auvergne-Rhône-Alpes
1675 establishments in France